Flaccus was a composer from the 2nd century BC, of whom little is known. He was either a freedman or a slave of one of Terence's patrons and wrote musical scores for Terence's comedies (playing or composing music was no occupation for a free citizen). Terence mentions him specifically in the opening didaskalia to each of his comedies, and in addition mentions the type of double reed pipe to be used in each. Some further commentary on the musical modes employed has puzzled scholars: it is not known whether Terence refers to melodies or musical metres.

Flaccus has the distinction of being the only composer of Ancient Rome of whom any music is alleged to remain. A musical phrase accompanying a single line of Terence's play Hecyra was copied in the 18th century by Italian composer Arcangelo Corelli from a 10th-century manuscript; however, musicologist Thomas J. Mathiesen comments that it is no longer believed to be authentic.

References
 
 Guenther Wille: Musica Romana: Die Bedeutung der Musik im Leben der Roemer (Amsterdam: Schippers, 1967), 158ff, 308ff
 Egert Pöhlmann, ed. Denkmäler altgriechischer Musik: Sammlung, Übertragung und Erläuterung aller Fragmente und Fälschungen (Nuremberg, 1970).  (1971 edition)
 This book contains the single neumed line of music.

Ancient music composers
Republican era slaves and freedmen
Ancient Roman music
2nd-century BC Romans